Oceanía metro station is a transfer station of the Mexico City Metro in Venustiano Carranza, Mexico City. It is a combined elevated and at-grade station, along Lines 5 (the Yellow Line) and B (the Green-and-Gray Line). Oceanía is located between Aragón and Terminal Aérea metro stations on Line 5, and between Deportivo Oceanía and Romero Rubio metro stations on Line B. It serves the colonias of Pensador Mexicano and Aquiles Serdán. The station is named after Oceanía Avenue and its pictogram depicts a kangaroo, a representative animal from Oceania.

Oceanía metro station opened on 19 December 1981 with service northward toward Consulado and southeastward toward Pantitlán on Line 5. West service on Line B toward Buenavista station and northeast toward Villa de Aragón station started on 15 December 1999. The station facilities are partially accessible for people with disabilities as there are tactile pavings and braille signage plates. Since it was opened, Oceanía metro station has had some incidents, including two fake bomb threats and a train crash, where one person indirectly died and twelve others resulted injured.  In 2019, the station had an overall average daily ridership of 18,953 passengers.

Location

Oceanía is a metro transfer station in the Venustiano Carranza borough, in northeastern Mexico City. The station lies on Río Consulado Avenue and Oceanía Avenue, and serves colonias (Mexican Spanish for "neighborhoods") of Pensador Mexicano and Aquiles Serdán. Within the system, it lies between Aragón and Terminal Aérea stations on Line 5; on Line B, between Deportivo Oceanía and Romero Rubio stations. The area is serviced by Line 4 (formerly Line G) of the trolleybus system, by Routes 43 and 200 of the Red de Transporte de Pasajeros network, and by Routes 10-D and 20-B of the city's public bus system.

Exits
There are four exits:
North: Norte 174 Street and Río Blanco Street, Pensador Mexicano (Line 5).
Southeast: Río Consulado Avenue, Pensador Mexicano (Line 5).
North: Río Consulado Avenue and Norte 170 Street, Pensador Mexicano (Line B).
South: Oceanía Avenue and Dinares Street, Aquiles Serdán (Line B).

History and construction

Line 5 of the Mexico City Metro was built by Cometro, a subsidiary of Empresas ICA; Oceanía Line 5 opened on 19 December 1981, on the first day of the service between Consulado and Pantitlán metro stations.

Line B of the Mexico City Metro was built by Empresas ICA; Oceanía Line B opened on 15 December 1999, on the first day of the then Buenavista–Villa de Aragón service. The station was built above the ground.

The passenger transfer tunnel that connects Line 5 with Line B has a short length and, according to Roberto Remes, director of Ciudad Humana MX—a sustainable mobility non-governmental organization—, it is too narrow and potentially dangerous for riders during rush hours. The station's pictogram depicts a kangaroo, a representative animal from Oceania and its name references the avenue in which it lies. The facilities are partially accessible for people with disabilities as there are tactile pavings and braille signage plates.

In 2008, Metro authorities had maintenance work done on Line 5 station's roof.

Incidents

2015 train crash
On 4 May 2015, at around 18:00 hours local time (00:00 UTC) during heavy rain with hail, two trains crashed while both were going toward Politécnico station. The first train, No. 4, was parked at the end of Oceanía station's platform after the driver reported that a plywood board was obstructing the tracks. The second train, No. 5, left Terminal Aérea station with the autopilot turned on despite the driver being asked to turn it off and to operate the train manually, as the protocol requests it when it rains because trains have to drive with reduced speed. Train No. 5 crashed into Train No. 4 at  – double the average on arrival at the platforms – and left twelve people injured.

According to the driver, the train slid due to the rain and hail, as he noticed it, he attempted to brake and later tried to deactivate the autopilot system. As both actions failed, he contacted the Central Control Center to request them to cut the energy. The Center did not reply and, as he realized the train would impact the parked one, he decided to jump out of the cab before the crash. The Metro system director, Joel Ortega, concluded that the accident was mainly a consequence of a "double human error"; the first one caused by the driver, who did not deactivate the autopilot when he was requested to do so, and the second by the Central Control Center regulator, who did not request Train No. 5 to stop at any point, even when the Train No. 4's driver had warned he would stop the train due to the obstruction.

Train No. 5 was a 40-year-old model that had been restored recently. It was removed from circulation in 2011 after it presented multiple braking problems. By 2014, it returned and operated for four hours on Line 7 before being returned to the workshops. As Line 5 is one of the least used lines in the system, the train was placed there instead. 

After the crash, the station was temporarily closed for repairs; a worker was killed when he fell to the tracks after a railcar in which he was standing uncoupled. Instead, an  that cost 65 million pesos was built to prevent the tracks from getting wet and to avoid trains from sliding.

Other
Two unrelated fake bomb threat incidents have occurred at Oceanía station. The first was in 1994 and was attributed to the Zapatista Army of National Liberation; the second was unattributed and happened on 7 May 2015. After the collapse of the elevated railway near Olivos station on Line 12 in May 2021, users reported the structural damage to other elevated stations, including Oceanía station. Mayor of Mexico City, Claudia Sheinbaum, said that the reports would be examined accordingly.

Ridership
According to the data provided by the authorities since the 2000s, in the last decade, commuters averaged between 5,400 and 9,600 daily entrances on Line 5 and between 5,700 and 12,600 daily entrances on Line B. In 2019, before the impact of the COVID-19 pandemic on public transport, the station's ridership totaled  6,918,126 passengers. For Line 5, the ridership was 3,129,656 passengers (8,574 per day), which was an increase of 54,327 passengers compared to 2018. For Line B, the station had a ridership of 3,788,470 passengers (10,379 per day), which was an increase of 176,461 passengers compared to 2018.

In 2019, the Line 5 station was the 161st busiest of the system's 195 stations, and the line's 6th busiest. The Line B station was the 153rd busiest in the system and the line's 15th busiest.

Notes

References

External links

1981 establishments in Mexico
1999 establishments in Mexico
Accessible Mexico City Metro stations
Mexico City Metro Line 5 stations
Mexico City Metro Line B stations
Mexico City Metro stations in Venustiano Carranza, Mexico City
Railway stations opened in 1981
Railway stations opened in 1999